NGC 753 is a spiral galaxy located 220 million light-years away in the constellation Andromeda. The galaxy was discovered by astronomer by Heinrich d'Arrest on September 16, 1865 and is a member of Abell 262.

NGC 753 has roughly 2-3 times more mass than the Milky Way and is classified as a radio galaxy.

Physical characteristics
NGC 753 contains two main arms that extend to 180° on either side of the galaxy. From the two main arms, there are three larger and weaker arms that sub-divide into several branches.

Supermassive black hole
NGC 753 has a supermassive black hole with an estimated mass of (2.2 ±  0.4) × 107 M☉.

Supernovae
NGC 753 has hosted two supernovae, SN 1954E which was discovered by Fritz Zwicky on September 26, 1954 and AT 2018ddf which was discovered on July 5, 2018. Both supernovae were of unknown types.

See also
 List of NGC objects (1–1000)

References

External links

753
7387
Andromeda (constellation)
Astronomical objects discovered in 1865
Spiral galaxies
Radio galaxies
Abell 262
1437